Jack L. Feldman is an American neuroscientist, David Geffen School of Medicine Chair in Neuroscience and Distinguished Professor of Neurobiology at the University of California, Los Angeles (UCLA). His research contributions include elucidating the mechanisms underlying breathing and sighing. He discovered and named the pre-Bötzinger complex, an area in the brain stem that is responsible for controlling breathing. He was the recipient of the Hodgkin–Huxley–Katz Prize from the Physiological Society in 2017.

Early life 
Feldman received his Bachelor's degree in physics from the Polytechnic Institute of NY in 1968, and a PhD in physics from the University of Chicago. His PhD focused breathing and respiratory networks from a theoretical perspective. He went on to perform experimental neuroscience as a postdoc in Paris with Henri Gautier and Andre Hugelin and a second postdoc with Mort Cohen in New York. In 1978, he began his first academic appointment as assistant professor at Northwestern in Chicago, where he went through the ranks to full professor. In 1986, he moved to UCLA, where he is a Distinguished Professor of Neurobiology.

Research 
Feldman's early research focused on locating the central pattern generator responsible for breathing in 1986 identified the pre-Bötzinger complex. The areas was so named because it was located immediately caudal to an area he had previously named the Bötzinger complex in 1978 after a bottle of Bötzinger wine that was being served during dinner. In 2016, he and his collaborators identified a neuropeptide that acts in the pre-Bötzinger complex to govern sighing. When this neuropeptide was introduced to the  pre-Bötzinger complex  animals engaged in vigorous respiratory sighing. 

Feldman has published over 150 peer-reviewed papers in scientific journals.

Honors 

 Fellow, American Association for the Advancement of Science (2009)
 Hodgkin Huxley Katz Prize, The Physiological Society (2016)

References 

American neuroscientists
Polytechnic Institute of New York University alumni
University of Chicago alumni
Year of birth missing (living people)
Living people